Lawrence Ng Lok-wang (born 14 October 1999) is a Hong Kong fencer. He competed in the men's team foil event at the 2020 Summer Olympics.

References

External links
 

1999 births
Living people
Hong Kong male foil fencers
Olympic fencers of Hong Kong
Fencers at the 2020 Summer Olympics
Place of birth missing (living people)
21st-century Hong Kong people